Bryan Mone (born October 20, 1995) is an American football nose tackle for the Seattle Seahawks of the National Football League (NFL). He played college football at Michigan.

College career
Mone was a member of the Michigan Wolverines for five seasons. He played in all 12 of Michigan's games as a true freshman, recording nine tackles (1.5 for loss), but missed his entire sophomore year after breaking his leg in preseason practice. As a fifth-year senior, Mone made 13 tackles (1.5 for loss) with a half a sack was named honorable mention All-Big Ten Conference. Mone finished his collegiate career with 43 tackles, 5.0 tackles for loss, two passes broken up and two fumble recoveries in 48 games played.

Professional career

Mone signed with the Seattle Seahawks as an undrafted free agent on April 28, 2019. Mone made his NFL debut on September 8, 2019, against the Cincinnati Bengals, making three tackles. He was waived on September 26, 2019, and re-signed to the practice squad. He was released on October 23. He was added back to practice squad on October 29. He was promoted to the active roster on December 20.

Mone re-signed with the Seahawks on April 23, 2020. He was placed on injured reserve on November 14, 2020. He was placed on the reserve/COVID-19 list by the team on December 5, 2020, and moved back to injured reserve on December 16. On December 26, 2020, Mone was activated off of injured reserve.

Mone signed an exclusive-rights free agent tender with the Seahawks on April 19, 2021.

On June 20, 2022, Mone signed a two-year contract extension with the Seahawks worth up to $12 million. He suffered a torn ACL in Week 15 and was placed on injured reserve on December 20, 2022.

References

External links
Seattle Seahawks bio
Michigan Wolverines bio

1995 births
Living people
American football defensive tackles
Michigan Wolverines football players
Players of American football from Salt Lake City
Seattle Seahawks players
Ed Block Courage Award recipients